Papenburg (East Frisian Low Saxon: Papenbörg) is a city in the district of Emsland, Lower Saxony, Germany, situated at the river Ems. It is known for its large shipyard, the Meyer-Werft, which specializes in building cruise liners.

Geography

Districts
Papenburg is subdivided into 6 urban districts, Papenburg-Untenende, Papenburg-Obenende, Herbrum, Tunxdorf-Nenndorf, Aschendorf and Bokel.

History
In the Chronicle of the Frisians, written in the 16th century by the East-Frisian council Eggerik Benninga, the Papenburg (at that time a manor) is mentioned for the first time.
In 1458, Hayo von Haren, called "von der Papenburch", confessed to be leaned with the Papenburg. The contract that was made because of this is the earliest verifiably documented mention of Papenburg.

On 2 December 1630, the district administrator Dietrich von Velen purchased the manor for 1500 Reichsthaler from Friedrich von Schwarzenberg in order to found a settlement in the fen-surrounded region.

On 4 April 1631, Bishop Ferdinand von Münster leased the then castle and manor Papenburg to Dietrich von Velen. This is considered to be the foundation of the city of Papenburg.

Matthias von Velen and his wife Margartha Anna, born von Galen, endowed the oldest church in Papenburg on 7 December 1680, dedicated to Anthony the Great, making him its patron saint.

From 1933 to 1945 a series of 15 moorland labor, punitive and POWs-camps were active in the districts of Emsland and Bentheim. The central administration was set in Papenburg where now a memorial of these camps, the Dokumentations- und Informationszentrum (DIZ) Emslandlager, is located.

Population
(always according to 31 December)
1998 - 33,671
1999 - 33,731
2000 - 34,096
2001 - 34,266
2002 - 34,403
2003 - 34,245
2004 - 34,440
2005 - 34,905
2006 - 34,797
2007 - 35,431
2012 - 37,532
2021 - 38.573

Twin towns – sister cities

Papenburg is twinned with:
 Pogranichny, Russia
 Rochefort, France

Gallery

References

External links

  
 Short introduction to Papenburg 

 
Populated places established in 1631
Emsland
1631 establishments in the Holy Roman Empire